Balotići is a village in the municipality of Rožaje, Montenegro.

Demographics
According to the 2011 census, its population was 685.

Notable people 
Bajram Balota

References

Populated places in Rožaje Municipality